The Concorde Book Award is an annual prize for children's literature awarded by South Gloucestershire secondary school students. It may be compared with the United Kingdom's  Children's Book Award, a national children's literature prize awarded through voting by children.

A group of South Gloucestershire school and public librarians founded the Concorde Book Award in the 2007-2008 school year, with the first award ceremony being held in 2008. Each year, secondary school students in South Gloucestershire are invited to nominate a recently published book for the award longlist. A small panel of librarians selects six books from the longlist to form the Concorde Book Award shortlist, which is announced in early fall.

Once the shortlist is announced, students may join reading groups at their school or public library to read and discuss the novels on the shortlist, before casting their vote for a winner. Voting is held on World Book Day, which is celebrated in March in the United Kingdom, though other countries typically observe it in April.



List of winning and shortlisted books

See also

 Blue Peter Book Awards
 Carnegie Medal
 Children's Laureate
 Kate Greenaway Medal
 Nestle Smarties Book Prize
 Red House Children's Book Award

References 

British children's literary awards
South Gloucestershire District
Awards established in 2008
2008 establishments in the United Kingdom